Events in the year 1963 in Portugal.

Events
 May 28 - Cais do Sodré disaster - the roof of the Cais do Sodré train station in Lisbon collapsed. The accident caused 49 deaths and 63 people were injured.

Incumbents
President: Américo Tomás 
Prime Minister: António de Oliveira Salazar

Sport
In association football, for the first-tier league seasons, see 1962–63 Primeira Divisão and 1963–64 Primeira Divisão; for the Taça de Portugal seasons, see 1962–63 Taça de Portugal and 1963–64 Taça de Portugal. 
 30 June - Taça de Portugal Final

Births
 26 January - José Mourinho, football manager, former football player
 14 July - Paulo Macedo, businessman and politician

References

 
Portugal
Years of the 20th century in Portugal
Portugal